Greensprings School is a British private school in Nigeria. It was established in the year 1985, in Lagos. It currently operates on the Anthony, Lekki and Ikoyi campuses. The school's offers include Crèche, Preschool, Elementary School, Secondary School and Sixth Form.

History
The school started as a montessori school in January 1985, with just three pupils, in the heart of Lagos mainland. At the moment, the school has three campuses in Lagos, with a population of over 3,500 students. The school is governed by a Board of Governors.

Fees
The school has a slightly costly school fees.

List of heads of school (Lekki Campus)

20052007: Mr. Howard Bullock
20082010: Mrs. Maeve Stevenson
20102016: Mr. Harry McFaul
20162019: Mrs. Bola Kolade
2019present: Mrs. Feyisara Ojugo

References

External links
 Official Website

Secondary schools in Lagos State
Schools in Lagos